Stephen Carter (born 5 February 1974) is a former Australian rules footballer who played with Port Adelaide in the Australian Football League (AFL).

In the 1994 AFL Draft, Carter was selected by Essendon with pick 39, but he decided to remain in South Australia and wait for Port Adelaide's entry to the league in 1997. He already played for Port Adelaide in the South Australian National Football League (SANFL) and was a zone selection for the AFL club.

Carter made 10 appearances for Port Adelaide in the 1997 AFL season, including their first ever game, against Collingwood at the MCG, but was delisted at the end of the year.

A half back flanker, he was a member of five Port Adelaide premiership teams in the SANFL during the 1990s.

References

External links
 
 

1974 births
Australian rules footballers from South Australia
Port Adelaide Football Club players
Port Adelaide Magpies players
Port Adelaide Football Club (SANFL) players
Port Adelaide Football Club players (all competitions)
Living people